Burgwallen Nieuwe Zijde is a neighborhood of Amsterdam, Netherlands.

Neighbourhoods of Amsterdam